Third Presbyterian Church may refer to:

in the United States

 Third Presbyterian Church (Birmingham, Alabama)
Third Presbyterian Church (Chester, Pennsylvania)
 Third Presbyterian Church (Springfield, Ohio), listed on the National Register of Historic Places (NRHP)
 Third Presbyterian Church (Greenville, South Carolina)
 Third Presbyterian Church Parsonage, Salt Lake City, Utah, NRHP-listed